Seeber may refer to:

 Francisco Seeber (1841–1913), Argentine military officer
 Guido Seeber (1879–1940), German cinematographer
 Horacio Seeber, (1907–1972), Argentine sailor
 Kristian Seeber, American drag queen
 Ludwig August Seeber (1793–1855), German physicist
 Richard Seeber (born 1962), Austrian politician 
 Robert Rex Seeber Jr. (1910–1969), American inventor

See also
 Seebers Branch, stream

German-language surnames